Recherche Archipelago Nature Reserve is a protected area located in the Recherche Archipelago off the south coast of Western Australia. As of 2012, visitor access is limited to Middle Island within the nature reserve and is only available via a licensed tour operator. The nature reserve is classified as an IUCN Category Ia protected area.

See also
 List of protected areas of Western Australia

References

Nature reserves in Western Australia
Goldfields-Esperance
Protected areas established in 1948
1948 establishments in Australia
Recherche Archipelago